Revenge of the O.C. Supertones is the seventh studio album released by the O.C. Supertones.

Track listing
 "Wake Me Up On Time" - 3:22
 "Where I Find You" - 3:53
 "We Shall Overcome" - 2:34
 "Transmission" - 2:24
 "Prince of Peace" - 3:03
 "Shepherd is the Lamb" - 4:38
 "Everything's Broken" - 3:46
 "The Kingdom" - 2:36
 "Faith of a Child" - 3:41
 "Cult of Cool" - 3:05
 "I Will Follow" - 2:59
 "Dream of Two Cities" - 10:09

Credits 

Production
 Mark Lee Townsend – producer 
 The O.C. Supertones – producers
 Jason Wilson – engineer
 Steve Winiarski – assistant engineer 
 J.R. McNeeley – mixing 
 Troy Glessner – mastering at Spectre Studios (Tacoma, Washington)
 Asterik Studio – design 
 Mike Payne – photography 

The O.C. Supertones
 Matt Morginsky – vocals, Moog synthesizer
 Ethan Luck – guitars, backing vocals 
 Chris Beaty – bass, 
 Jason Carson – drums, percussion 
 Daniel Spencer – trombone, backing vocals 
 Darren Mettler – trumpet, backing vocals

Additional musicians
 John Davis – acoustic piano (4), Hammond organ (4), lead guitar (4), backing vocals (4), gang vocals 
 Rob Roy Fingerhead – nylon guitar (9), gang vocals 
 Sam Branhart – gang vocals

References 

2004 albums
The O.C. Supertones albums
BEC Recordings albums